Felix Müller (born 27 January 1993) is a German former professional footballer who played as a defender.

International career
Müller is a youth international for Germany.

References

External links
 
 Profile at kicker.de

1993 births
Living people
People from Rodalben
Association football midfielders
German footballers
Germany youth international footballers
2. Bundesliga players
3. Liga players
1. FSV Mainz 05 II players
SC Preußen Münster players
Würzburger Kickers players
SV Sandhausen players
SpVgg Unterhaching players
SV Elversberg players
Footballers from Rhineland-Palatinate